, frequently abbreviated as "Doramaga" or "DM", is a Japanese light novel and manga magazine aimed at young adult males, first published in 1988. Since March 19, 2008 the magazine has been published every other month. The light novel magazine Fantasia Battle Royal was a special edition of Dragon Magazine.

Serialized works

Many popular light novels which were later animated were originally serialized in it. The magazine also features one or two manga series at a time. 

Former serialized works also include:
Black Blood Brothers
Chaika - The Coffin Princess
Chrono Crusade
Detatoko Princess
Dragon Half
Good Luck! Ninomiya-kun
High School DxD
Hyper Police
I Couldn't Become a Hero, So I Reluctantly Decided to Get a Job.
Kaze no Stigma
Patlabor
Saber Marionette
Samurai Girl: Real Bout High School
Scrapped Princess
Slayers
Sorcerous Stabber Orphen
Student Council's Discretion
Sword World RPG
The Ambition of Oda Nobuna
The Weathering Continent

References

External links
 Official website

1988 establishments in Japan
Bi-monthly manga magazines published in Japan
Fujimi Shobo
Light novel magazines
Magazines established in 1988
Magazines published in Tokyo